Mark van der Maarel (born 12 August 1989) is a Dutch professional footballer who plays as a right-back for FC Utrecht of the Eredivisie, where he has spent his entire professional career. Born in Arnhem, he is of Indonesian descent through his mother, who is from Indonesia.

Club career
Born in Arnhem, Van der Maarel played for Argon in his youth, and after a spell in the Haarlem youth, he joined FC Utrecht in May 2008.

He made his debut on 22 August 2009 in a friendly against non-league side USV Elinkwijk. His first league match was on 20 September at ADO Den Haag, where he replaced the injured Sander Keller after 67 minutes. Due to injuries to regular right back and team captain Tim Cornelisse, he kept his place in the first team and made an impressive contribution to the best start to a season ever for  Utrecht. In the 1–0 win against champions AZ he was voted Man of the Match.

In the 2017–18 season, Van der Maarel was named FC Utrecht Player of the Year by the club's supporters and thereby won the David di Tommaso Trophy. The fans rewarded him for his perseverance and the fact that during the season he broke the iconic boundary of 200 Eredivisie matches for Utrecht. In addition, the defender managed to score four goals.

On 22 February 2021, Van der Maarel signed a two-year contract extension, keeping him part of Utrecht until 2023. At that point, he had made 307 official appearances for the club, making him sixth on the all-time list of most games played for Utrecht.

International career
On 5 October, Van der Maarel was called up for Netherlands U21, for the European U21 Championship group 4 qualifiers at Finland and Poland. Here he also benefited from injury problems by his replacing Feyenoord defender Kelvin Leerdam.

References

External links
 

1989 births
Living people
Dutch people of Indonesian descent
Association football fullbacks
Footballers from Arnhem
Dutch footballers
SV Argon players
HFC Haarlem players
FC Utrecht players
Jong FC Utrecht players
Eredivisie players